Ali Ben Maghenia (born 7 January 1961) is a French boxer. He competed in the men's bantamweight event at the 1980 Summer Olympics.

References

1961 births
Living people
French male boxers
Olympic boxers of France
Boxers at the 1980 Summer Olympics
Place of birth missing (living people)
Bantamweight boxers